A Christmas Carol is a play by Jack Thorne based on the 1843 novella of the same name by Charles Dickens.

Production history

The Old Vic, London (2017- present) 
The adaptation premiered at the Old Vic in London on 20 November 2017, running until 20 January 2018, starring Rhys Ifans as Ebenezer Scrooge. The production is directed by Old Vic Artistic Director Matthew Warchus and designed by Rob Howell, with music composed and orchestrated by Chris Nightingale. Notably, the production's design transforms the Old Vic proscenium stage into the round with seating onstage and a walkway going through the centre of the stalls, creating a more immersive environment for the audience and the performers (who greet and hand out mince pies and satsumas to members of the audience before the play begins).

Following the success of the production, it was revived at the Old Vic for the 2018 season (24 November 2018 to 19 January 2019, starring Stephen Tompkinson as Scrooge) before returning again for the 2019 season (23 November 2019 to 18 January 2020, starring Paterson Joseph as Scrooge).

The production was scheduled to return for the 2020 season from 21 November 2020 to 16 January 2021; however, due to the ongoing pandemic, the production was performed as part of the Old Vic: In Camera series from 12 to 24 December 2020, being broadcast live from the empty Old Vic auditorium and streamed to audiences via Zoom. Andrew Lincoln starred as Scrooge, with many members of the cast from previous years at the Old Vic returning.

The production returned again (for audiences to attend in person) from 13 November 2021 to 8 January 2022 starring Stephen Mangan as Scrooge and returned the following year from 12 November 2022 to 7 January 2023, starring Owen Teale as Scrooge. It was announced that the production will return for 7th year in a row from 11 November 2023 to 6 January 2024 with casting to be announced.

Broadway (2019) 
For the 2019 season, The Old Vic production opened on Broadway at the Lyceum Theatre from November 7, 2019, until January 5, 2020, starring Campbell Scott as Ebenezer Scrooge. Unlike the Old Vic, the production was adapted into a traditional proscenium arch setting. The production was due to Broadway for the 2020 season, but it was cancelled due to the COVID pandemic.

Dublin (2019) 
A new production ran at the Gate Theatre, Dublin from 15 November 2019 to 18 January 2020 which was directed by Selina Cartmell with set and lighting designed by Ciaran Bagnall and  costumes designed by Katie Davenport.

US tour and San Francisco (2021) 
The production toured the US opening at the First Interstate Center for the Arts, Spokane, Washington from November 12 to 13, 2021 followed by The Orpheum Theatre, Phoenix, Arizona (November 18–21), The Smith Center, Las Vegas (November 23–28), Golden Gate Theater, San Francisco (November 26-December 26) and the Ahmanson Theatre, Los Angeles (November 30 to January 1, 2022) starring Bradley Whitford as Scrooge.

A separate production ran at the Golden Gate Theater, San Francisco from November 26 to December 26, 2021 starring Francois Battiste as Scrooge.

Melbourne (2022) 
The Old Vic production will have its Australian premiere at the Comedy Theatre, Melbourne running from 12 November until 29 December 2022, starring David Wenham as Scrooge.

Cast and characters

The Old Vic, London casts (2017 to present)

Other worldwide casts (2019 to present)

List of carols used 

 God Rest You Merry, Gentlemen
 It Came Upon the Midnight Clear
 Il est né, le divin Enfant
 I Saw Three Ships
 Wassail! Wassail! All Over the Town
 O Holy Night
 In the Bleak Midwinter
 Ding Dong Merrily on High
 Coventry Carol
 See, amid the Winter's Snow
 Joy to the World
 Silent Night

Differences from the novella 
After his reformation, Scrooge is reunited with Belle, the love of his life, who ended their engagement in their youth after he was corrupted by greed. Following the three spirits reforming Scrooge, he goes to Belle's house, where she is happy to learn of his change of heart, though both know that Belle cannot abandon her family. They exchange Christmas greetings before they part ways.

Awards and nominations

See also
 Adaptations of A Christmas Carol

References 

2017 plays
A Christmas Carol
Plays based on A Christmas Carol
British plays
Broadway plays
Plays set in London
Christmas plays
Tony Award-winning plays